Simone Pasticcio (born 11 January 1976 in Genoa) is an Italian footballer. He plays as a defender. He played for Entella and Genoa C.F.C. youth teams and made his debut in Serie A on 21 May 1995 against Foggia. He then returned to play for Entella and for Mestre.

Playing career
1993-1996  Genoa 1 (0)
1996-1997  Entella 28 (6)
1997-1998  Mestre 10 (0)
1998-1999  Entella 28 (2)
1999-2001  Grassorutese 55 (1)
2002-2003  Chiavari Lames 28 (0)
2003  Chiavari VL 6 (0)
2003-2004  Sammargheritese 23 (1)
2004-2005  Rivasamba 26 (1)
2005-2008  Cicagna 84 (15)
2009-2010  Fontanabuona Cicagna  ? (?)

References

External links
 http://www.lega-calcio.it/it/Archivio-Storico/Curriculum-Giocatore.page?id=12570

Living people
1976 births
Italian footballers
Association football defenders